Mahlkot is an area situated in the Kozhikode district of the Kerala state in India. The very same name is some times used to refer to an area in Tirurangadi taluk of Malappuram district.

People
Mahlkot is a small area in Feroke town area of Kozhikode district. It got its name because of the Mahls who came from other areas and settled near and in Feroke.

Mahls